Ängelholm Municipality (Ängelholms kommun) is a municipality in Scania County in South Sweden in southern Sweden. Its seat is located in the city  Ängelholm.

In 1971 the City of Ängelholm was amalgamated with the rural municipalities Ausås, Barkåkra, Hjärnarp and Munka-Ljungby, thus creating a municipality of unitary type. In 1974 a parish from the dissolved municipality Östra Ljungby was added.

Ängelholm was until recently the home of a major airforce base.  The base is now closed down and the premises taken over by the supercar manufacturer Koenigsegg.

A notable landmark is the UFO memorial at Ängelholm. It is a model of a flying saucer, situated on a site where a UFO allegedly landed 18 May 1946.

Localities
There are 9 urban areas (also called a tätort, or locality) in Ängelholm Municipality.

In the table the localities are listed according to the size of the population as of 31 December 2005. The municipal seat is in bold characters.

1) A minor part of Vejbystrand is in Båstad Municipality

International relations 
The municipality is twinned with:

 Høje-Taastrup Municipality, Denmark
 Maaninka, Finland
 Dobele, Latvia
 Kamen, Germany (North Rhine-Westphalia)

See also 
 Linjeflyg flight 277

References
Statistics Sweden

External links 

Ängelholm - Official site (Swedish)
 - Official site (English)
Coat of arms
Ängelholm Tourist Office (English)

Ängelholm Municipality
Municipalities of Skåne County